Rebel With a Cause is the debut album by Ghetts. It was released on 10 March 2014 through independent label Disrupt, following ten years' worth of mixtapes and singles. It entered the UK Albums Chart at number 23.

The album earned Ghetts numerous accolades; including 3 MOBO nominations, a BET nomination, the award for 'Hardest Working Artist' at the AIM Independent Awards and 2 Urban Music Awards for 'Best Album' and 'Best Male'. "Rebel With a Cause" also draws influences from other genres such as rock, jazz, and reggae.

Singles 
"Rebel" was released as a promotional single with a video accompaniment, available for download when you pre-ordered the album from 4 February 2014 onward. "Rude Boy" was released as the album's second single on 20 May 2014, gaining heavy airplay on BBC Radio 1Xtra. "Gas Mark 9" was released as the third single with a video accompaniment on 11 August 2014. Notably, the video version of the song is different to the album version, incorporating spoken word performance. "Fire Burning" was released on 30 November 2014 as the album's fourth single. The release also contains a remix of "Man Like Me" featuring new verses from Chip, Devlin, and Kano.

"Party Animal" (featuring Kano) was the only single that was not featured on the album (due to unknown reasons); but had been released in 2013 shortly after "Definition of a Rebel" & "The Cypher" had been released.

Track listing

Notes
  signifies an additional producer
 Let's Throw Shapes is Nick Amour and Gulzar Lally.

Chart performance

References

2014 debut albums
Ghetts albums